Jasenov is a village and municipality in Humenné District in the Prešov Region of north-east Slovakia.

History
In historical records the village was first mentioned in 1279. Jasenov has a castle that dates from the mid-14th century, when it was owned by Phillip Drugeth. It was later destroyed in 1644.

Geography
The municipality lies at an altitude of 155 metres and covers an area of 13.262 km².
It has a population of about 1140 people.

Landmarks

Genealogical resources
The records for genealogical research are available at the state archive "Statny Archiv in Presov, Slovakia"

 Roman Catholic church records (births/marriages/deaths): 1802-1911 (parish B)
 Greek Catholic church records (births/marriages/deaths): 1768-1946 (parish B)

See also
 List of municipalities and towns in Slovakia

References

External links
 
 
 https://web.archive.org/web/20071027094149/http://www.statistics.sk/mosmis/eng/run.html
 Surnames of living people in Jasenov

Villages and municipalities in Humenné District